Sitara Aur Mehrunissa is a Pakistani Urdu television series  written by Anwar Maqsood.  It starred Sania Saeed as Mehrunissa and Atiqa Odho as Sitara in her debut performance. Other members of the cast included Anwar Maqsood, Azra Sherwani and Sajid Hassan. Sitara Aur Mehrunissa was very popular and was screened during prime time television. It telecast in 1992 on NTM

Synopsis
The story was about two cousins Sitara and Mehrunnisa and what problems they have to face after their marriages. Sitara has to go through a mental turmoil whereas Mehrunnisa has to suffer at the hands of her husband.

Cast
 Atiqa Odho as Sitara
 Sania Saeed as Mehrunissa
 Sajid Hassan
 Azra Sherwani
 Anwar Maqsood
 Latif Kapadia
 Akbar Subhani

See also
 Network Television Marketing (NTM TV Channel)

References

External links
 

1990s Pakistani television series
Urdu-language television shows
Pakistani drama television series
Pakistani television series
Pakistan Television Corporation original programming